Bruno Viana Willemen da Silva (born 5 February 1995) is a Brazilian football player who plays as a centre back for Coritiba.

Career

Cruzeiro
On 10 March 2016, he made his professional debut with Cruzeiro in a 2–1 victory over Atlético Paranaense.

Olympiacos
On 31 August 2016, the last day of pre-season transfer window, Viana joined Olympiacos.

The transfer of Viana to Olympiacos for €2 million is remarkable among the transfers involving Cruzeiro defenders. In Brazilian currency, the transfer of Bruno Viana was the fourth largest to reach R$7.6 million due to the devaluation of the real against the euro and the US dollar.

On 5 February 2017, he scored his first goal with the club, opening the score in a 3–0 home Superleague win against Iraklis.
On 7 July 2017, he signed a single-season contract with Portuguese club Braga on loan from Olympiacos. On 29 October 2017, he scored his first goal with the club sealing a 1–0 home win game against Chaves.

Braga
On 1 March 2018 according to recent reports from Portugal, Braga have decided to buy talented central defender from Olympiacos. The Portuguese club will have to pay an estimated amount of €3 million in the summer of 2018, in order to secure the capture of 23-year-old Brazilian stopper, who has made 26 official performances with four goals in all competitions during 2017–18 season.
Eventually, after his impressive half session with Braga, the Brazilian defender has completed his permanent transfer to the Portuguese club.  It’s reported that Olympiacos will receive €3 million for the deal, while Viana is rewarded with a five-year Braga contract through to 2023.

Flamengo (loan)
On 12 February 2021, Viana joined Flamengo on a season-long loan with an option to buy.

Khimki (loan)
On 9 February 2022, Viana joined Russian Premier League club Khimki on loan until the end of the season. The loan was terminated early following the Russian invasion of Ukraine.

Wuhan Yangtze River
On 28 April 2022, Viana joined Chinese Super League club Wuhan Yangtze River.

Career statistics

Club

Honours
Flamengo
Supercopa do Brasil: 2021
Campeonato Carioca: 2021

Braga
Taça de Portugal: 2020–21

References

External links

1995 births
Living people
People from Macaé
Brazilian footballers
Association football defenders
Cruzeiro Esporte Clube players
Olympiacos F.C. players
S.C. Braga players
CR Flamengo footballers
FC Khimki players
Wuhan F.C. players
Coritiba Foot Ball Club players
Campeonato Brasileiro Série A players
Super League Greece players
Primeira Liga players
Russian Premier League players
Chinese Super League players
Brazilian expatriate footballers
Brazilian expatriate sportspeople in Greece
Brazilian expatriate sportspeople in Portugal
Brazilian expatriate sportspeople in Russia
Brazilian expatriate sportspeople in China
Expatriate footballers in Greece
Expatriate footballers in Portugal
Expatriate footballers in Russia
Expatriate footballers in China
Sportspeople from Rio de Janeiro (state)